is the Shinto kami ("god; deity") of folk wisdom, knowledge and agriculture, and is represented in Japanese mythology as a scarecrow who cannot walk but has comprehensive awareness.

Names
Kuebiko is the main name for this kami.  There is also an alternate name of Yamada no sohodo, mentioned in the Kojiki.

The meaning could be translated as something like "shabby young man".

The meaning of this name could be construed as "soaked person of the mountain paddies", a euphemism for "scarecrow".

Mythology
The (c. 712) Kojiki ("Record of Ancient Matters") has the earliest reference to Kuebiko in the myth of Ōkuninushi ("Great Land Master"). When Ōkuninushi was at Cape Miho in Izumo, a small kami arrived in a boat. Nobody knew his name, but a toad suggested asking Kuebiko, who revealed the god was a scion of the goddess Kami-musubi (神産巣日) named Sukuna-bikona (少彦名神). In Basil Hall Chamberlain's translation, 

Then the toad spoke, saying: "As for this, the Crumbling Prince will surely know it." Thereupon [the Deity Master-of-the-Great-Land] summoned and asked the Crumbling-Prince, who replied, saying: "This is the Little-Prince-the-Renowned-Deity, the august child of the Deity-Producing-Wondrous-Deity." ... So [the Deity here] called the Crumbling Prince, who revealed the Little-Prince-the-Renowned-Deity, is what is now [called] the scarecrow in the mountain fields. This Deity, though his legs do not walk, is a Deity who knows everything in the Empire.

Many cultures have knowledge deity myths. Kuebiko is paralleled by two other Japanese kami of wisdom: Fukurokuju and Omoikane.

Modern usages
In the present day, Kuebiko is worshipped as the god of agriculture or scholarship and wisdom. The Kuebiko Shrine (Kuebiko jinja 久延彦神社), which is a subordinate shrine (massha) of Ōmiwa Shrine in Sakurai, Nara, is dedicated to this deity.

Kuebiko is a boss in the video game Shin Megami Tensei IV. Appearing in the Tokyo Metropolitan Government Office, he refuses to negotiate with humans, saying he has lived in Shinjuku long before humans arrived to 'rule' over it.

Kuebiko is the name of a 2011 agricultural art exhibit, "Because he stands all day outdoors, he knows everything", held in Kimito, Finland.

See also 
 Ting mong, a Cambodian scarecrow used against spirits and plagues

References 

Japanese gods
Knowledge gods
Scarecrows
Shinto kami
Wisdom gods
Kunitsukami